The 2018 European Men's U-20 Handball Championship was the twelfth edition of the European Men's U-20 Handball Championship, held in Celje, Slovenia from 19 to 29 July 2018.

Qualified teams

Draw
The draw was held on 19 February 2018 in Celje.

Preliminary round
All times are local (UTC+2).

Group A

Group B

Group C

Group D

Intermediate round

Group I1

Group I2

Main round

Group M1

Group M2

Final round

Bracket

Championship bracket

9th place bracket

5th place bracket

13th place bracket

13–16th place semifinals

9–12th place semifinals

5–8th place semifinals

Semifinals

15th place game

13th place game

Eleventh place game

Ninth place game

Seventh place game

Fifth place game

Third place game

Final

Final ranking

Awards

All-Star Team

References

External links
 Official website
 EHF 

European Men's U-20 Handball Championship
European U-20 Handball Championship
European U-20 Handball Championship
European U-20 Handball Championship
European U-20 Handball Championship
European U-20 Handball Championship